This article lists the confirmed squads for the 2021 FIH Junior World Cup tournament to be held in Potchefstroom, South Africa between 5–16 December 2022.

Pool A

Canada
The squad was announced on 15 February 2022.

Head coach: Jenn Beagan

Netherlands
Head coach:

United States
Head coach: Tracey Paul

Zimbabwe

The squad was announced on 28 February 2022.

Head coach: Tendayi Maredza

Pool B

England

The squad was announced on 17 March 2022.

Head coach: Simon Letchford

Ireland
The squad was announced on 17 November 2021.

Head coach: David Passmore

South Africa

The squad was announced on 10 March 2021.

Head coach: Lenise Marais

Pool C

Argentina
Head coach: Fernando Ferrara

Austria
Head coach: Corinna Zerbs

South Korea

The squad was announced on 28 February 2022.

Head coach: Hwang Nam-young

Uruguay
Head coach: Andrés Vázquez

Pool D

India
The squad was announced on 17 March 2022.

Head coach:  Erik Wonink

Germany
Head coach: Akim Bouchouchi

Malaysia
Head coach: Nasihin Ibrahim

Wales
The squad was announced on 10 March 2022.

Head coach:  Walid Abdo

References

Squads
Women's Hockey Junior World Cup squads